A condominium (plural either condominia, as in Latin, or condominiums) in international law is a political territory (state or border area) in or over which multiple sovereign powers formally agree to share equal dominium (in the sense of sovereignty) and exercise their rights jointly, without dividing it into "national" zones.

Although a condominium has always been recognized as a theoretical possibility, condominia have been rare in practice. A major problem, and the reason so few have existed, is the difficulty of ensuring co-operation between the sovereign powers; once the understanding fails, the status is likely to become untenable.

The word is recorded in English since c. 1714, from Modern Latin, apparently coined in Germany c. 1700 from Latin con- 'together' + dominium 'right of ownership' (compare domain). A condominium of three sovereign powers is sometimes called a tripartite condominium or tridominium.

Current condominia

Abyei Area 
The 2005 Comprehensive Peace Agreement, which ended the Second Sudanese Civil War, created a special status administrative area known as the Abyei Area, which is considered to simultaneously be part of West Kordofan state and Northern Bahr el Ghazal state. Following the independence of South Sudan in 2011, the area effectively became a condominium between the Republic of South Sudan and the Republic of the Sudan.

Antarctica 
Antarctica is a de facto continental  condominium, governed by the 29 parties to the Antarctic Treaty that have consulting status.

Brčko District 
In Bosnia and Herzegovina, the Brčko District forms a condominium between the Federation of Bosnia and Herzegovina and Republika Srpska.

Gulf of Fonseca 
El Salvador, Honduras, and Nicaragua exercise a tripartite condominium over parts of the Gulf of Fonseca and of the territorial sea outside its mouth.

Joint Regime Area 
As an alternative to delimiting their sea boundary, Colombia and Jamaica share a maritime condominium called the Joint Regime Area in the Caribbean Sea by mutual agreement. The outer portion of the EEZ of each country otherwise would overlap in this area. Unlike other "joint development zones", this condominium appears not to have been purposed simply as a way to divide oil, fisheries or other resources.

Lake Constance 
Austria, Germany, and Switzerland consider themselves to hold a tripartite condominium (albeit on different grounds) over the main part of Lake Constance (without its islands).  On the other hand, Switzerland holds the view that the border runs through the middle of the lake. Hence, no international treaty establishes where the borders of Switzerland, Germany, and Austria, in or around Lake Constance, lie.

Moselle 
The Moselle and its tributaries, the Sauer and the Our, constitute a condominium between Germany and Luxembourg, which also includes bridges, about 15 river islands of varying size, and the tip of one island, Staustufe Apach, near Schengen (the rest of the island is in France). The condominium was established by treaty in 1816.

Pheasant Island 
Pheasant Island (also known as Conference Island, Isla de los Faisanes in Spanish,  Île de la Conférence in French or  Konpantzia in Basque) in the Bidassoa is a condominium between France and Spain. It was established by the Treaty of the Pyrenees in 1659. It is formally administered by Spain between 1 February and 31 July each year (181 or 182 days) and by France between 1 August and 31 January each year (184 days). The island has no permanent population and has been eroded significantly by the river.

Co-principality 
Under French law, Andorra was once considered to be a French–Spanish condominium, although it is more commonly classed as a co-principality, since it is itself a sovereign state, not a possession of one or more foreign powers. However, the position of head of state is shared ex officio by two foreigners, one of whom is the President of France, currently Emmanuel Macron, and the other the Bishop of Urgell in Spain, Joan Enric Vives i Sicília.

Former condominia 

 Allied-occupied Germany and subsequently East Germany, West Germany, and West Berlin were under the control of the Allied Control Council, which consisted of representatives from France, the Soviet Union, the United States, and the United Kingdom from 1945 until 1990.
 In 688 the Byzantine Emperor Justinian II and the Umayyad Caliph Abd al-Malik ibn Marwan reached an unprecedented agreement to establish a condominium (the concept did not yet exist) over Cyprus, with the collected taxes from the island being equally divided between the two parties. The arrangement lasted for some 300 years, even though in the same time there was nearly constant warfare between the two parties on the mainland. 
 Fellesdistrikt was a Russo-Norwegian condominium in the municipality of Sør-Varanger and the Pechengsky District from 1684 until 1826.
 
 Anglo-Egyptian Sudan was legally an Egyptian-British condominium from 1899 until 1956, although in reality Egypt played no role in its government other than providing some administrators in the country: all political decisions were made by the United Kingdom and all Governors-General of Anglo-Egyptian Sudan were British. The system was resented by Egyptian and Sudanese nationalists, and would later be disavowed by the Egyptian Government, although it persisted due to the United Kingdom's effective control over Egypt itself, which began from 1882 and continued until at least 1936.
 The Condominium of Bosnia and Herzegovina was jointly ruled by Cisleithanian Austria and Hungary between 1908 and 1918, while both countries were parts of the Austro-Hungarian Empire.
 An islet in the border river Brömsebäck was considered to belong to neither (or both) Denmark and Sweden.
 The Duchy of Courland was a condominium of the Grand Duchy of Lithuania and the Crown of Poland from 1726 until 1795.
 The Independent State of Croatia during World War II from 1941 to 1943 was a military condominium of Nazi Germany and Fascist Italy until 1943, when Italy split between the Allied-leaning Kingdom of Italy under King Victor Emmanuel III and Axis-leaning Italian Social Republic under Benito Mussolini.
 Canton and Enderbury Islands were a British–American condominium from 1939 until 1979 when they became part of Kiribati.
 Couto Misto was shared until 1864 between Spain and Portugal, even though in its final decades of existence it was de facto independent.
 Egypt from 1876–1882 was under France and the United Kingdom.
 A small area (Hadf and surroundings) on the Arabian Peninsula, a part of Oman, at one time was jointly ruled with the Emirati member state of Ajman.  The agreement defining the Hadf zone was signed in Salalah on 26 April 1960 by Sultan Said bin Taimur and in Ajman on 30 April 1960 by Shaikh Rashid bin Humaid Al Nuaimi, ruler of Ajman. This provided for some joint supervision in the zone by the ruler of Ajman and the shaikhs under the rule of Muscat. It allowed the Ajman ruler to continue collecting zakat (Islamic tax). The ruler of Ajman was, however, not to interfere in the affairs of the local people, the Bani Ka'ab (a branch of the Banu Kaab), which were the sole responsibility of shaikhs who were under Muscat rule.  The agreement was later terminated.
The Holy Roman Empire hosted numerous condominia within its boundaries. Many princes and especially Imperial knights and counts mortgaged partial ownership or rights within their lands to the Emperor, sometimes in perpetuity. Most of these were located in the Swabian Circle, close to the Emperor's personal domains in Further Austria. Some condominia were shared by lesser princes, especially in cases of inheritances held in common by branches of a princely line. Disputes over condominium contracts were submitted to the Imperial court at Wetzlar, or petitioned to the Emperor himself. Some cases within the Holy Roman Empire included the following:
 The City of Bergedorf was a condominium of the Imperial cities of Hamburg and Lübeck, and the terms were extended beyond the Holy Roman Empire's dissolution until 1868, when Lübeck sold its rights in Bergedorf to Hamburg.
 The City of Erfurt from 12th century until the Thirty Years' War was shared between the Archbishopric of Mainz and the Counts of Gleichen, the latter replaced by the city council in 1289 (Concordata Gebhardi), the Landgrave of Thuringia in 1327 and the House of Wettin in 1483 (Treaty of Weimar).
 The County of Friesland (West Frisia) was from 1165 to 1493 a joint condominium of the County of Holland and the Prince-Bishopric of Utrecht, then again until 25 October 1555 under Imperial administration.
 The Imperial village of Holzhausen was a partial condominium, two thirds of which was immediate to the Emperor and the remaining third subject to various landlords. 
 The City of Maastricht was a condominium for five centuries until 1794. It was shared between the Prince-Bishopric of Liège and the Duchy of Brabant, the latter replaced by the Dutch Republic in 1632
 The village of Nennig was a condominium of the Trier bishopric, Lorraine (the Kingdom of France from 1766) and Duchy of Luxembourg until its annexation by Revolutionary France in 1794.
 The County of Sponheim was ruled since the 15th century by the Margraves of Baden, the Counts Palatine of the Rhine and the Counts of Veldenz, later Palatinate-Simmern, Palatine Zweibrücken and Palatinate-Birkenfeld as heirs of Veldenz.
 The Free City of Kraków was a protectorate of Prussia, Austria and Russia from 1815 until 1846, when it was annexed by Austria.
 Neutral Moresnet was shared from 1816 until 1919 between the Netherlands (later Belgium) and Prussia
 Nauru was a tripartite condominium mandate territory administered by Australia, New Zealand and United Kingdom from 1923 to 1942 and again in 1947 as a UN trust territory until independence in 1968.
 New Hebrides formed a French–British condominium in 1906 until independence in 1980 as a republic, now called Vanuatu
 Northern Dobruja was shared by the Central Powers (Germany, Austria-Hungary, and Bulgaria) during World War I.
 The Oregon Country was an Anglo-American condominium from 1818 until 1846. It would later become the Pacific Northwest of the United States and British Columbia in Canada. 
 Samoan Islands from 1889 to 1899 were a rare tripartite condominium under joint protectorate of Germany, the United Kingdom and the United States. It would later become Samoa and American Samoa. 
Schleswig, Holstein and Lauenburg were an Austrian-Prussian condominium. The two German powers acceded it following the 1864 Second Schleswig War. According to the Gastein Convention in the next year, Lauenburg left the condominium (to Prussia), Austria governed Holstein and Prussia controlled Schleswig. In 1866, after the Austro-Prussian War, Austria passed over its remaining rights to Prussia. Prussia later created the Province of Schleswig-Holstein, which would become divided between Germany and Denmark after the Treaty of Versailles.
 The Spanish Netherlands became an Anglo-Dutch condominium in 1706 during the War of the Spanish Succession, until the peace treaties of Utrecht and Rastatt in 1713/14 ending the war.
 Togoland, formerly a German protectorate, was an Anglo-French condominium, from when the United Kingdom and France occupied it on 26 August 1914 until its partition on 27 December 1916 into French and British zones. The divided Togoland became two separate League of Nations mandates on 20 July 1922: British Togoland, which joined Gold Coast (present-day Ghana) in 1956, and French Togoland, which is now the nation of Togo.
 Zaporozhian Sich, a brief condominium between Russia and Poland-Lithuania, was established in 1667 by the Treaty of Andrusovo.
 Tangier International Zone, an international zone nominally under Moroccan sovereignty but jointly administered by several European powers in 1924. It was returned to full Moroccan sovereignty in 1956.
 The term is sometimes even applied to a similar arrangement between members of a Monarch's countries in (personal or formal) union, as was the case for the district of Fiume (what is today Rijeka, Republic of Croatia), shared between Hungary and Croatia within the Habsburg Empire since 1868. 
 Between 1913 and 1920 Spitsbergen was a neutral condominium. The Spitsbergen Treaty of 9 February 1920 recognises the full and absolute sovereignty of Norway over all the arctic archipelago of Svalbard. The exercise of sovereignty is, however, subject to certain stipulations, and not all Norwegian law applies. Originally limited to nine signatory nations, over 40 are now signatories of the treaty. Citizens of any of the signatory countries may settle in the archipelago. Currently, only Norway and Russia make use of this right.
 In 1992, South Africa and Namibia established a Joint Administrative Authority in the enclave of Walvis Bay, prior to its cession to Namibia in 1994.

Proposed condominia
 In a 2019 essay, former Australian Prime Minister Kevin Rudd suggested that Australia should consider a "formal constitutional condominium" with Tuvalu, Kiribati, and Nauru as a solution to the impacts of climate change. Rudd outlined that the people of these countries would be offered Australian citizenship and relocation to Australian territory in exchange for Australian ownership of their territorial seas, exclusive economic zones, and fisheries.
 In 2001, the British government held discussions with Spain with a view to putting a proposal for joint sovereignty to the people of Gibraltar. This initiative was pre-emptively rejected by Gibraltarians in the 2002 referendum.
 In 2012, the Canadian and Danish governments were close to an agreement to declare Hans Island a condominium, after decades in dispute. On 11 June 2022, the Danish, Greenlandic, Canadian, and Nunavut governments compromised to divide Hans Island in half after 17 years of negotiations. On 14 June 2022, Canadian Foreign Affairs Minister Mélanie Joly, Danish foreign affairs minister Jeppe Kofod, and prime minister of Greenland Múte Bourup Egede signed a treaty to divide the island. By this, Canada and the Danish Realm, via Greenland, will have an international land border of 1,280 m (4,200 ft), which follows a rift, which forms a semi-circle with the westernmost part around the middle, in the surface of the island that runs from north to south near the centre of the island. On ratification, the island will contain the third shortest land border between countries, and will create a second land neighbour for Canada and the Danish Realm, each of which only had one, with the United States and Germany respectively. It will also create the northernmost international land border in the world, as well as the second land border between European and American countries, the previous one being between French Guiana (départment of France) and the South American countries Brazil and Suriname.
 Some proposed two-state solutions to the Israeli–Palestinian conflict involve a State of Israel and State of Palestine sharing sovereignty over part or all of Jerusalem.
 In the talks between the UK and the People's Republic of China in 1983–84 over the transfer of sovereignty over Hong Kong, one of the British proposals was to transfer the sovereignty of Hong Kong and its dependencies to the People's Republic of China while the UK would retain the rights of administration of the territory. The proposal was rejected and negotiations ended with the UK agreeing to relinquish all rights over Hong Kong to China in 1997.
 In one proposed case of the Partition of Belgium, Brussels would become a condominium of Flanders and Wallonia.
 In 1984, the New Ireland Forum suggested a proposal for joint UK/Irish authority in Northern Ireland to try to bring an end to the Troubles conflict. This idea was dismissed by the British government. The Good Friday Agreement of 1998 led to the establishment of a devolved power-sharing Northern Ireland Executive led jointly by the First and Deputy First Minister, positions nominated separately by the largest parties in each of the two largest community designations in the assembly. The proposal of joint authority by the UK and Irish governments over Northern Ireland was raised again in 2017 after the Irish backstop issue during the negotiations for the Brexit withdrawal agreement and the collapse of the power-sharing executive during the Renewable Heat Incentive scandal.

See also 
 CoDominium – a fictional political alliance and union between the United States of America and a revitalized Soviet Union that rules Earth and space
 Concurrent jurisdiction
 Corpus separatum
 Dependent territory
 Free city (disambiguation)
 International city
 Party wall in common law
 Principality
 Protectorate
 Suzerainty
 Terra nullius
 Transboundary protected area

References

External links
 WorldStatesmen – see each present country

Colonialism
Constitutional state types
International law
Types of geographical division
 
Client state